1918 flu pandemic in India was the outbreak of an unusually deadly influenza pandemic in British India between 1918 and 1920 as a part of the worldwide Spanish flu pandemic. Also referred to as the Bombay Influenza or the Bombay Fever in India, the pandemic is believed to have killed up to 17–18  million people in the country, the most among all countries. David Arnold (2019) estimates at least 12 million dead, about 5% of the population. The decade between 1911 and 1921 was the only census period in which India's population fell, mostly due to devastation of the Spanish flu pandemic. The death toll in India's British-ruled districts was 13.88 million.

The pandemic broke out in Bombay in June 1918,  with one of the possible routes being via ships carrying troops returning from the First World War in Europe. The outbreak then spread across the country from west and south to east and north, reaching the whole of the country by August. It hit different parts of the country in three waves with the second wave being the highest in mortality rate. The death rate peaked in the last week of September 1918 in Bombay, in the middle of October in Madras, and in the middle of November in Calcutta.

The outbreak most severely affected younger people in the age group of 20–40, with women disproportionately impacted. According to the Sanitary Commissioner's report for 1918, the maximum death toll in a week exceeded 200 deaths in both Bombay and Madras. The spread of the disease was exacerbated by a failed monsoon and the resultant famine-like conditions, that had left people underfed and weak, and forced them to move into densely populated cities. As a result of the severity of the outbreak, the year 1919 saw a reduction of births by around 30 percent. The population growth of India during the decade of 1911–1921 was 1.2%, the lowest among all decades under the British Raj. In his memoirs the Hindi poet, Suryakant Tripathi, wrote "Ganga was swollen with dead bodies." The sanitary commissioner's report for 1918 also noted that all rivers across India were clogged up with bodies, because of a shortage of firewood for cremation.

Mahatma Gandhi, the leader of India's independence struggle, was also infected by the virus. The pandemic had a significant influence in the freedom movement in the country. The healthcare system in the country was unable to meet the sudden increase in demands for medical attention. The consequent toll of death and misery, and economic fallout brought about by the pandemic led to an increase in emotion against colonial rule.

References

Further reading 
 

Epidemics in India
1918 in India
Spanish flu
Influenza pandemics
India in World War I
1918 disasters in India